Bluestein is a surname. Notable people with the surname include:

 Abe Bluestein (1909–1997), American anarchist and editor
 Barbara Simons (née Bluestein, born 1941), American computer scientist 
 Greg Bluestein, American journalist 
 Howard B. Bluestein, American research meteorologist
 Susan Bluestein (born 1946), American casting director

Fictional characters include:
 Suzanna Bluestein, in the Japanese anime Divergence Eve

See also 
 Bluestein's FFT algorithm
 Blaustein (surname)

Germanic-language surnames